Keele University Science and Innovation Park is a science and business development facility located on the campus of Keele University in North Staffordshire and was established in the mid-1980s. It is wholly owned by Keele University.  One of five key employment sites in Staffordshire, the role of the Science Park is to support the growth of innovative businesses, particularly those active in research and development within the West Midlands region by providing a location and a wide range of business support services.

History

The success of the Merseyside Innovation Centre established in 1980 to promote technology transfer between local academia and industry in Liverpool spawned a second wave of science parks in the UK.  Riding on its crest, in late 1985, Newcastle-under-Lyme Borough Council declared interest in creating a science park at Keele University. Opened in December 1986, the Stephenson building, located close to the main university campus was the first development unit and currently houses Cobra Biologics, a pharmaceutical company. The Darwin building followed suit in 1991. In 1999, Keele Park Developments was set-up as a joint venture with Pochin Development to create one of four Innovation Centres.  Pochin sold its interest back to Keele in 2013. Keele University Science & Innovation Park is home to over 40 companies and employs over 600 staff.  Occupancy of the Science Park remains at circa 95% of available space (including some university occupancy in IC1 and IC2).

In May 2015, a Science Park review recommended the re-branding of the park with a requirement for tenants to be active in core academic activities, further development of the Nova Centre as an incubation for start-up companies and a Directorate of Engagement and Partnerships to lead future initiatives.

All employees of the Science Park can benefit from local campus amenities (bank, pharmacy, cafés) including the Sports Centre. There is also a Day Nursery available for 128 children aged 3 months to 5 years on campus.  St John’s CE Primary School provides further facilities in Keele village.

Phase 1 development

Phase 1 of expansion witnessed the construction of two new 'Innovation Centres', facilities for business enterprises.

Innovation Centre 1

The first building simply called 'Innovation Centre' and labelled on the side as just IC was opened in 1999 by Her Majesty The Queen.  With over 24,500 square feet, it is the home of companies such as Bma and Siemens Wind Power R&D.

Innovation Centre 2

IC2 was opened shortly after in 2002.  Following a review of the Science Park Strategy Group in 2015, it was agreed that IC2 would serve as the primary building for consolidation of University occupation of science park buildings over the next 5 years.

Phase 2 development
Phase 2 was closely associated with the newly created Keele University School of Medicine with the aim to attract biotechnology companies, especially given the proximity to academic expertise and the university's specialist resources.  For example, Alliance Medical Radiopharmacy, a subsidiary of Alliance Medical, produces radio-pharmaceuticals and tracers for use in positron emission tomography–computed tomography (or better known as PET-CT).  The company, founded in Dublin in 2001 moved to Keele in 2005 to benefit from the relationship and closer UK client base.

Medical Innovation Centre 3

IC3 seeks to focus on medical technology and health economy start-ups with seven laboratories alongside office space.  It was opened in 2005.

Medical Innovation Centre 4
IC4 placed the emphasis on purpose-built business space with capacity for bespoke laboratory and a purpose-built plant room. The building was officially opened in 2006.

Phase 3 development
Phase 3 development seeks to focus on well-designed, environmentally advanced facilities for innovative, technology-led occupiers, inward investment and university uses.  These would typically include new energy ventures desiring to tap into Keele University's cutting-edge expertise in green technology. A recent example is OMNI Heat and Power, a successful green start-up which has already secured the exclusive UK distribution rights the Inresol Genious portable combined heat and power engine. The unit is the only one in the UK that can be used as a portable electrical three-phase generator, or a micro combined heat and power (CHP) generator. With the advent of the SMART Energy Network Demonstrator and the creation on campus of Keele's own private utility network (heat, power, waste), the Science Park could be the first in the UK to be fully sustainable and a magnet for green entrepreneurs.

Innovation Centre 5 
IC5 opened in August 2016 and provides further office, laboratory and workshop facilities.  Staffordshire County Council owns the building but Keele University manages it and provide the marketing and business support services leading to its occupation.

Innovation Centre 6
In April 2016, Keele University and Staffordshire County Council initiated discussion for the realization of a sixth business unit with new legislative changes allowing local authorities to retain business rates revenue.  As part of the 'Keele New Deal', in January 2017, Keele announced it would provide £5.51 million of funding and will own the building, while the county council will take a long lease on IC6 with a peppercorn rent.  The building was opened in 2020 and located adjacent to the new Mercia Centre for Innovation Leadership (MCIL).

International Centre for Childhood Disability
Opened in 2018, the Caudwell Children International Centre for Childhood Disability is the UK’s first purpose-built centre for multi-disciplinary therapy programmes for childhood disability and research of neurodevelopmental conditions, including autism.

Further Plans for development

Innovation Centre 7 
IC7, scheduled for opening in 2022, will focus on data analytics, artificial intelligence and machine learning.  The new building will be adjacent to the new flagship international hotel.

Academic Buildings and Leisure

Keele Harper Adams University Veterinary School 
A new veterinary training school including a referral hospital are scheduled to open in September 2020 with operating theatres, an advanced diagnostic suite and equipment such as MRI and CT scanners.  The school will be built opposite the "Smart Innovation Hub".

Flagship international hotel
Finally, planning permission has been granted for a 150-bed, 4* flagship international hotel with conferencing facilities.

Gallery

Notes 

Keele University